Victor Bak Jensen (born 3 October 2003) is a Danish professional footballer who plays as a left-back for Danish Superliga club FC Midtjylland.

Career

FC Midtjylland
Victor Bak Jensen began his career at IF Nordthy, but switched to FC Midtjylland as an U12 player, where he became part of the FCM Elite Football School. Bak Jensen worked his way up through the youth ranks and began training with the clubs first team squad during the 2021–22 season. At the end of December 2021, Bak Jensen signed a new five-year deal with Midtjylland. On 22 May 2022, Bak Jensen was called up for his first professional game against Randers FC. He got his debut in the same game, playing the whole second half.

To gain some more experience, the club confirmed on 30 August 2022, that Bak Jensen had joined Danish 1st Division side Hobro IK on a one-year loan deal. Bak Jensen made his debut for Hobro in a 6–0 defeat against Hvidovre IF on 1 September 2022.

References

External links
Profile at the FC Midtjylland website

Victor Bak Jensen at DBU

2003 births
Living people
Danish men's footballers
Denmark youth international footballers
Association football defenders
Danish Superliga players
Danish 1st Division players
FC Midtjylland players
Hobro IK players